Ornithogalum maculatum is a flowering plant native to the Cape Provinces of South Africa.

References

External links 

Gallery of the World's Bulbs
Květena Kapska (Flora of the Cape region)

maculatum
Flora of the Cape Provinces